The  is a railway station on the Takayama Main Line in the city of Gero, Gifu Prefecture, Japan, operated by Central Japan Railway Company (JR Central).

Lines

Station layout
Hida-Hagiwara Station has one ground-level island platform and one ground-level side platform connected by a footbridge. The station is staffed.

Platforms

Adjacent stations

History
Hida-Hagiwara Station opened on May 9, 1931. The station was absorbed into the JR Central network upon the privatization of Japanese National Railways (JNR) on April 1, 1987.

Passenger statistics
In fiscal 2015, the station was used by an average of 434 passengers daily (boarding passengers only).

Surrounding area
Ruins of Hagiwara-Suwa Castle

See also
 List of Railway Stations in Japan

References

Railway stations in Gifu Prefecture
Takayama Main Line
Railway stations in Japan opened in 1931
Stations of Central Japan Railway Company
Gero, Gifu